The 1977–78 Texas Longhorns men's basketball team represented the University of Texas at Austin in the 1977–78 NCAA Division I men's basketball season as a member of the Southwest Conference. They finished the season 26-5 overall, tied for the SWC regular season title with a 14–2 record and won the 1978 National Invitation Tournament. They were coached by Abe Lemons in his second season as head coach of the Longhorns. They played their home games at the Special Events Center in Austin, Texas.

Roster

Schedule

|-
!colspan=12 style=| Regular season

|-
!colspan=9 style=|SWC tournament

|-
!colspan=9 style=|NIT

Rankings

References

Texas Longhorns men's basketball seasons
National Invitation Tournament championship seasons
Texas
Texas